Michael John Vermuelen (born 30 December 1982) is a New Zealand cricketer who, as a right-arm medium-fast bowler, made his first class debut for Canterbury at the end of the 2009/10 domestic season. He took four wickets against Auckland.

Notes

External links

1982 births
Cricketers from Christchurch
New Zealand cricketers
Canterbury cricketers
Living people